A college of physicians is a national or provincial organisation concerned with the practice of medicine.

Such institutions include:

 American College of Physicians
 Ceylon College of Physicians
 College of Physicians and Surgeons of Manitoba
 College of Physicians & Surgeons of Mumbai
 College of Physicians and Surgeons of Ontario
 College of Physicians & Surgeons Pakistan
 College of Physicians of Philadelphia
 Ghana College of Physicians and Surgeons
 Lebanese Order of Physicians
 Philippine College of Physicians
 Royal Australasian College of Physicians of Australia and New Zealand
 Royal College of Physicians and Surgeons of Canada
 Royal College of Physicians and Surgeons of Glasgow
 Royal College of Physicians of Edinburgh
 Royal College of Physicians of Ireland
 Royal College of Physicians of London
 Rwanda College of Physicians
 West African College of Physicians and Surgeons